This is a list of American television-related events in 1967.

Events

Television programs

Debuts

Ending this year

Television specials and/or miniseries

Television stations

Sign-ons

Network affiliation changes

Station closures

Births

Deaths

References

External links 
List of 1967 American television series at IMDb